Adinath temple may refer to:

 Adinath Temple, Maheshkhali in Bangladesh
 Adinatha temple, Khajuraho in India
 Adinath Lokeshwar, a temple in Nepal
 Adinath Temple, a former name of Adina Mosque, Malda, West Bengal